Cathedral Oceans II is an album of instrumental ambient music by John Foxx. It was released in 2003 as disc two of a two disk set, the first disk being the original Cathedral Oceans album, now renamed Cathedral Oceans I. The second album follows on from the first in style and substance.

The back cover of the CD digipack introduces the combined track listing as "...music for a vast, half-submerged ruined cathedral...". Cathedral Oceans III was released two years later. In 2016, a box set including these albums, titled The Complete Cathedral Oceans, was released.

Track listing 
 All tracks written by John Foxx.
 "Revolving Birdsong"
 "Shimmer Symmetry"
 "Far and Wide 2"
 "Ad Infinitum"
 "Quiet Splendour"
 "Luminous and Gone"
 "Stillness and Wonder"
 "Return to a Place of Remembered Beauty"
 "Visible and Invisible"

References 

John Foxx albums
2003 albums